WOR TV Tower was a  lattice tower used for FM- and TV-broadcasting at North Bergen, New Jersey, USA. The 420-ton tower was built in 1949. At the time of its construction, it was the tenth-tallest man-made structure in the world. At the beginning of 1953, the TV transmissions were moved to Empire State Building, but the tower remained. On November 8, 1956, the top of the tower was hit by a small aircraft, which knocked off the top and killed six people. The tower was later dismantled.

See also
 List of tallest buildings in North Hudson
 List of towers
 List of famous transmission sites

References

External links
 WOR-TV North Bergen Transmitter
 WOR-TV and FM Transmitter in North Bergen, NJ
  The New Yorker June 6, 1949 p.14

Lattice towers
Mass media in Hudson County, New Jersey
Towers in New Jersey
Former radio masts and towers
Demolished buildings and structures in New Jersey
RKO General
North Bergen, New Jersey